Andrew Mitchell Torrance (1845 – 4 February 1909) was a Scottish Liberal Party politician.

Background
He was born in Old Cumnock, East Ayrshire in 1845. He was educated at Cumnock parish school. In 1861 he was apprenticed to Peter Kelso & Co., muslin manufacturers of Glasgow. In 1863, moving to London, he worked for Smith, Anderson & Co. In 1875, he became a partner and the firm changed its name to Miller, Son, & Torrance. He was given a knighthood in 1906.

Municipal career
He was elected to the London County Council as a Liberal backed Progressive Party member representing Islington East. He was re-elected on every occasion until standing down in 1907. He was Deputy Chairman of the London County Council in 1897-98 and again in 1900-01 and served as Chairman in 1901–02. 
He was also involved in Islington Borough municipal politics, being elected to the council and serving as mayor of Islington from 1903 to 1905.
In June 1903, he was appointed a deputy lieutenant of the County of London.

Parliamentary career
Torrance first stood for Parliament at the 1900 general election in Islington East (his London County Council seat), but lost by a wide margin to the sitting Conservative MP Benjamin Louis Cohen.

At the next general election, in January 1906 he chose to contest a seat in his native Scotland and was elected as the MP for Glasgow Central (UK Parliament constituency), defeating the sitting Conservative MP John George Alexander Baird by a margin of 3.4%.

References

External links 

Portrait & Biography; http://gdl.cdlr.strath.ac.uk/eyrwho/eyrwho1710.htm

Members of the Parliament of the United Kingdom for Glasgow constituencies
1845 births
1909 deaths
Deputy Lieutenants of the County of London
Members of London County Council
Progressive Party (London) politicians
Scottish Liberal Party MPs
UK MPs 1906–1910
Members of Islington Metropolitan Borough Council
Mayors of places in Greater London